The China Railways KD7 type steam locomotive was a type of 2-8-0 mainline general purpose steam locomotive. KD7 locomotives were built in the United States and supplied to China by UNRRA as part of the post war rehabilitation effort in 1946. China received 160 locos while others of the same design went to Belgium as NMBS/SNCB Type 29.

At least four KD7s are thought to have been preserved. KD7 534 is at Beijing Railway Museum, KD7 587 is at Shanghai History Museum and KD7 641 is at Shanghai Railway Museum and KD7 513 at the Datong Locomotive Works Museum. A fifth loco, KD7 511, was reported to be under restoration in Hangzhou in 2002.

See also 
China Railways KD6
China Railways JF10
NMBS/SNCB Type 29

References 

Steam locomotives of China
Standard gauge locomotives of China
Railway locomotives introduced in 1946
Train-related introductions in 1946
2-8-0 locomotives
ALCO locomotives
Baldwin locomotives
Lima locomotives
1′D h2 locomotives
Freight locomotives